Mezi proudy (English: Between the Currents) is a trilogy of  Czech novels, written by Alois Jirásek. It was published between 1891 and 1909, and it is composed of Mezi proudy (Between the Currents), Proti všem (Against All the World, 1894) and Bratrstavo (Brotherhood, 1900–1909).

References

20th-century Czech novels
Novels by Alois Jirásek
Novel series
Literary trilogies